The 1998 Fareham Council election took place on 7 May 1998 to elect members of Fareham Borough Council in Hampshire, England. One third of the council was up for election and the Labour party stayed in overall control of the council.

After the election, the composition of the council was
Liberal Democrat 16
Conservative 14
Labour 8
Others 4

Election result

Ward results

References

1998
1998 English local elections
1990s in Hampshire